Homi Mullan (1940 - 2015) was an Indian percussionist born in Kolkata. He is widely recognised for his musical contributions to Bengali and Hindi films. Mullan worked with musical directors including; S. D. Burman, Madan Mohan, Naushad and R. D. Burman.

Musical career
Homi Mullan commenced his musical career in Kolkata at a young age. In Kolkata, Mullan was acquainted with musical director and singer Pankaj Mullick. Mullick offered Mullan a role where he would play percussion used in Bengali films. Mullan accepted Mullicks offer. 

Mullan's worked with various other musicians. These musicians included; Sailesh Dasgupta, Shyamal Mitra, and Nachiketa Ghosh. 

Mullan assisted R. D. Burman  in introducing percussion to the Bollywood film industry.  

Burman's direction and guidance saw percussion become a significant musical element in the Bollywood film industry today.  

Mullan retired from the music industry after Burman's death in 1994.

References

Indian male composers